Hurley is a surname of Irish and English origin, with the Irish version of the name being far more common. The English version of the name is a habitational name from places of the same name in Berkshire and Warwickshire; the name being derived from Old English hyrne ‘corner’, ‘bend’ + leah ‘wood’, ‘clearing'.

In Ireland, the surname Hurley has become the English version of at least three distinct original Irish names: the Ó hUirthile, part of the Dál gCais tribal group, based in Clare and North Tipperary; the Ó Muirthile, from the environs of Kilbrittain in west Cork; and the Ó hIarlatha, from the district of Ballyvourney, also in Cork, whose name is more usually anglicised "(O')Herlihy". The principal concentrations of Hurleys are today found in counties Tipperary and Limerick, where they spread from the original Dalcassian homeland, and in Cork. An example of the pseudo-translation of surnames is found in Clare, where some whose name was originally Hurley have now adopted the surname "Commane", since the Irish for the hurley-stick used in the sport of hurling is camán while the name "Commane" does not originate from that source.

The exact meaning of the name Hurley is uncertain, due to it being a conglomerate of various Irish names.  The "O'Muirthile" root in particular seems to roughly translate to "of the sea tides". But while Murphy is the most common surname in all of Ireland, Hurley is found almost exclusively in Munster. It is one of the more common names in County Cork, with something of a presence in Kerry and Limerick as well, but is rare in the rest of the island. Whether or not it is a regional variant of "Murphy" in Southwestern Ireland is unknown.

People with the surname
Adam CR Hurley (born 1970), Artist, Creative and Martial Artist
Alexander Hurley (1871–1913), British performer
Andrew Hurley (academic), English translator of Spanish literature
Andrew Michael Hurley (born 1975), English novelist
Andy Hurley (born 1980), American drummer
Annette Hurley (born 1955), Australian Senator
Billy Hurley III (born 1982) American professional golfer
An American family involved with basketball:
Bob Hurley (born 1947), high school coach and Hall of Famer
His older son Bobby Hurley (born 1971), former player and current coach
His younger son Dan Hurley (born 1973), former player and current coach
Bruce Hurley (1934–2020), American politician
Chad Hurley (born 1977), American businessman
Charles Hurley (disambiguation), multiple people
Chris Hurley (footballer) (born 1943), English former footballer
Chris Hurley (police officer), Queensland police officer involved in the 2004 Palm Island death in custody
Clyde Hurley (1916–1963), American Big Band Era musician
David Hurley (born 1953) Retired Australian General and Governor of New South Wales, Governor-general of Australia
David Hurley (singer) (born 1962), English countertenor and member of the King's Singers
Denis Hurley (disambiguation), multiple people
Dick Hurley (1847–aft. 1916), American baseball player
Douglas G. Hurley (born 1966), NASA astronaut
Eddie Hurley (1908–1969), American baseball umpire
Elizabeth Hurley (born 1965), British model and actress
Eric Hurley (born 1985), professional baseball pitcher 
Francis Thomas Hurley (1927–2016), American Roman Catholic archbishop
Francis X. Hurley (1903–1976), American politician
Frank Hurley (1885–1962), Australian photographer, member of Ernest Shackleton's exploration team
Frank Hurley (rugby league), Australian rugby league footballer of the 1930s, and 1940s
George Hurley (born 1958), drummer for The Minutemen, and Firehose
Graham Hurley (born 1946), novelist
James Francis Hurley (born c. 1966), English murderer
Colonel John Hurley (fl. 1694), Jacobite and Rapparee
Joseph L. Hurley (1898–1956), American politician
Kameron Hurley, American science fiction/fantasy writer and Hugo Award winner
Luke Hurley (born 1957), New Zealand songwriter
Marcus Hurley (1883–1941), American cyclist
Mark Joseph Hurley (1919–2001), American Roman Catholic bishop
Marty Hurley (born 1946), American marching band musician
Michael Hurley (disambiguation), multiple people
Myke Hurley, British podcaster
Patrick J. Hurley (1883–1963), American soldier, statesman and diplomat
Paul Hurley (born 1946), former American ice hockey player
Peter Hurley, Australian Broadcasting Corporation board member
Rosalind Hurley (1929–2004), knighted for service to medicine, science and law
Ryan Hurley (born 1975), former West Indian cricketer
Sean Hurley (1897–1961), Irish Sinologist
Steven Hurley (born 1962), American music producer and DJ
Ted Hurley (born 1945), Irish mathematician 
Tonya Hurley, American writer and director
William Hurley (disambiguation), multiple people

See also
 O'Hurley (surname)
 O'Herlihy (surname)

References

External links
 Surname History: Hurley – Irish Times

Surnames
Irish families
Surnames of Irish origin
Surnames of English origin
Families of Irish ancestry
Anglicised Irish-language surnames
Septs of the Dál gCais